FR1 or FR-1 may refer to:
 FR-1 or Ryan FR Fireball, an American mixed-power fighter aircraft
 FR1 (Lazio regional railways) or FL1, an Italian railway line
 FR-1 (satellite), a French satellite
 Renault FR1, a model of coach bus
 12002 Suess or 1996 FR1, an asteroid
 Waterdeep and the North's product code
 FR1, a 5G NR radio frequency band

See also
 FR F1, a French sniper rifle